Francisco Jerman (16 October 1920 – 19 March 1980) was an Argentine cross-country skier. He competed in the men's 15 kilometre event at the 1960 Winter Olympics.

His sons Marcos Luis Jerman, Martín Tomás Jerman and Matías José Jerman were also Olympic cross-country skiers for Argentina.

References

External links
 
 

1920 births
1980 deaths
Argentine male cross-country skiers
Olympic cross-country skiers of Argentina
Cross-country skiers at the 1960 Winter Olympics
People from the Municipality of Dol pri Ljubljani